Doggy's Angels was a rap trio formed by Snoop Dogg on the Doggy Style subsidiary of TVT. Members are Big Chan (Chan Gaines), Coniyac (Kim Proby-Davis) and Kola Loc (Kola Marion).

The group released one album and single in 2000. The album, Pleezbaleevit! peaked at number 7 on Billboard's Top Independent Albums chart, number 8 on the Heatseekers chart and number 35 on the Top R&B/Hip-Hop Albums chart. The single "Baby If You're Ready" ascended to number 1 on the Hot R&B/Hip-Hop Songs chart.

Biography

Legal problems 
The release of their debut album led to a lawsuit by Columbia Pictures, who claimed infringement against the Charlie's Angels franchise. The band was renamed "Tha Angels", but in spite of the success of their initial release produced no other albums before disbanding in 2002. In 2005, Chan Gaines sued the label for $100 million in royalties for her performances in the band; the suit was settled on March 24, 2006.

Discography

Albums

Singles

References

External links 
 
 

TVT Records artists
Hip hop groups from California
Musical groups from Los Angeles
Gangsta rap groups
G-funk groups
American musical trios
Women hip hop groups